The black-crested tit (Periparus ater melanolophus), also known as the spot-winged tit, is a bird in the family Paridae.  It was formerly considered a species, but is now widely considered a subspecies of the coal tit.

Distribution and habitat
It is found in boreal forests and temperate forests in the northern parts of the Indian subcontinent, mainly in the Himalayas, ranging across Afghanistan, Bhutan, India, Nepal and Pakistan.

Taxonomy
The black-crested tit was formerly considered its own species closely related to the coal tit, but the two are now widely considered conspecific based on similar vocalizations and behavior, along with paraphyly of the traditional coal tit if black-crested tit is excluded. It intergrades with the coal tit subspecies P. a. aemodius in western Nepal.

Gallery

black-crested tit
Birds of Afghanistan
Birds of Pakistan
Birds of North India
Birds of Nepal
black-crested tit
black-crested tit
Taxonomy articles created by Polbot